Unión Deportiva Aretxabaleta Kirol Elkartea, (Unión Deportiva Aretxabaleta  / Aretxabaleta Kirol Elkartea ) is a Basque football team based in Aretxabaleta, in the autonomous community of Basque Country. Founded in 1946, it currently plays in División de Honor, holding home matches at Estadio Ibarra, which has a capacity of 500 spectators.

Season to season

5 season in Tercera División

Famous players
 Andoni Zubizarreta
Bixente Etxeandia
José Javier Barkero
Imanol Etxeberria
Igor Arenaza
Mikel Etxabe

External links
Profile at fgf-gff.org
Futbolme.com 

Football clubs in the Basque Country (autonomous community)
Association football clubs established in 1946
Divisiones Regionales de Fútbol clubs
1946 establishments in Spain
Sport in Gipuzkoa